The New Jersey Conservation Foundation is a private non-profit organization that works to preserve land and natural resources in the state of New Jersey. Since its founding in 1960, the Foundation has protected 125,000 acres of open space, farmland, and parks.

History
The foundation was established in 1960 as the Great Swamp Committee. The goal of the committee was to prevent the building of a large airport in the Great Swamp.

References

External links

Environmental organizations based in New Jersey
Non-profit organizations based in New Jersey
Organizations established in 1960
1960 establishments in New Jersey